HNA Technology Co., Ltd. formerly known as Tianjin Tianhai Investment Co., Ltd. is a Chinese holding company which specialized in marine transportation services. However, in recent year it was most known as the investment vehicle of HNA Group to acquire American company Ingram Micro. The shares of Tianhai Investment, A share and B share (Chinese stock terminology) were both listed in the Shanghai Stock Exchange.

History
The company was fined by China Securities Regulatory Commission in 2003 for delay to publish 2002 Annual Report.

In 2015 Tianjin Marine Shipping was renamed to Tianhai Investment.

In 2016, Tianhai Investment acquired Ingram Micro in a leveraged buyout, which the company borrowed a huge sum from the Agricultural Bank of China.

In November 2017, as part of a planned reverse IPO, the listed company was proposed to rename to HNA Technology, namesake of its largest shareholder HNA Technology Group.

According to an interview with a staff from parent company HNA Technology Group in 2019, HNA Technology had 11 ships to be sold, including Capesize cargo ships. It was reported that the company had sold a ship Grand Amanda in 2018.

References

External links
 

Companies listed on the Shanghai Stock Exchange
Companies based in Tianjin
HNA Group
Holding companies of China
Civilian-run enterprises of China